John McFarlane (born 1947) is the chairman of Barclays.

John McFarlane may also refer to:

John McFarlane (Australian politician) (1854–1915)
John McFarlane (Canadian politician), Ontario MPP for Middlesex East riding, 1912–1919
John McFarlane (cricketer) (1933-2010), New Zealand cricketer
John McFarlane (footballer, born 1905) (1905–?), Scottish footballer (Liverpool FC)
John McFarlane (footballer, born 1899) (1899–1956), Scottish footballer (Celtic FC, Middlesbrough FC)
John Hector McFarlane 
John McFarlane of Sluts of Trust

See also
John MacFarlane (disambiguation)